Janbolaq (also Romanized as Janbolāq, Chāh Bolāgh, Jāh Bolāgh, Jān Bolāgh, Jenbolāq, and Jinbulāgh) is a village and commercial hub in Darreh Seydi Rural District, in the Central District of Borujerd County, Lorestan Province, Iran. At the 2006 census, its population was 81, in 24 families.

References 

Towns and villages in Borujerd County